The 2015 American League Wild Card Game was a play-in game during Major League Baseball's (MLB) 2015 postseason played between the American League's (AL) two wild card teams, the New York Yankees and the Houston Astros. It was held at Yankee Stadium on October 6, 2015.

The Astros defeated the Yankees, 3–0. It was the Astros' first playoff win since Game 6 of the 2005 NLCS and their first victory in a winner-take-all postseason game. With the Yankees eliminated, all four remaining teams in the 2015 ALDS were expansion teams.

Background
The Yankees clinched a wild card berth on October 1, while the Astros clinched a wild card berth on October 4, the final day of the regular season. The Yankees hosted the game, as they finished the regular season with a better win–loss record. This was the Astros' first postseason appearance as an AL team, and first overall since 2005, while the Yankees appeared in the postseason for the first time since 2012. As such, this was the first postseason meeting between the Astros and the Yankees.

Game results

Line score

Houston's Dallas Keuchel struck out seven batters and allowed only three hits in six innings of work. The Astros' bullpen then retired nine of ten Yankee batters for the victory.
The Astros were paced offensively by leadoff home runs by Colby Rasmus in the second inning and Carlos Gómez in the fourth, as New York starter Masahiro Tanaka struggled to find command of his pitches.
Tanaka lasted five innings, striking out three.

Houston's José Altuve scored Jonathan Villar from second base in the seventh inning against Yankee reliever Dellin Betances, the final run of the game.

References

External links

Box Score

American League Wild Card Game
Major League Baseball Wild Card Game
Houston Astros postseason
New York Yankees postseason
American League Wild Card Game
American League Wild Card Game
2010s in the Bronx